Kirkham is a village in North Yorkshire, England, close to Malton, situated in the Howardian Hills alongside the River Derwent, and is notable for the nearby ruins of Kirkham Priory, an Augustinian establishment.

Kirkham was historically an extra parochial area in the East Riding of Yorkshire.  It became a civil parish in 1866.  In 1935 the civil parish was abolished and merged into the civil parish of Firby. In 1974 it was transferred to the new county of North Yorkshire, and when the parish of Firby was abolished it joined the parish of Westow.

Kirkham was served by Kirkham Abbey railway station on the York to Scarborough Line between 1845 and 1930.

John Oxley (1785-1828), an explorer of south-east Australia, was born here.

References

External links

Villages in North Yorkshire
Former civil parishes in North Yorkshire